Denise Poirier-Rivard (born May 19, 1941) is a Canadian politician. Poirier-Rivard was a Bloc Québécois member of the House of Commons of Canada representing the district of Châteauguay—Saint-Constant. First elected in the 2004 election. Poirier-Rivard was the Bloc's critic of the Agriculture and Agri-Food.

Born in Montreal, Quebec, Poirier-Rivard was a cheese maker and farmer.

External links
 

1941 births
Living people
Members of the House of Commons of Canada from Quebec
Bloc Québécois MPs
Women members of the House of Commons of Canada
Women in Quebec politics
21st-century Canadian politicians
21st-century Canadian women politicians